Come On Down is an album by guitarist Jimmy Ponder that was released by Muse in 1991.

Track listing 
All compositions by Jimmy Ponder except where noted
 "Uncle Steve" – 5:49
 "Ebb Tide" (Robert Maxwell, Carl Sigman) – 3:22
 "Secret Love" (Sammy Fain, Paul Francis Webster) – 5:33
 "Barbara" (Horace Silver) – 6:32
 "Come on Down" – 10:10
 "A Subtle One" (Stanley Turrentine) – 5:59
 "A Tribute to a Rose" – 2:16
 "Fats" (Dennis Alston) – 4:58

Personnel 
Jimmy Ponder – guitar
Houston Person – tenor saxophone (tracks 1, 3, 5 & 6)
Lonnie Smith – organ  
Winard Harper – drums
Sammy Figueroa – congas, percussion

References 

Jimmy Ponder albums
1991 albums
Muse Records albums
Albums recorded at Van Gelder Studio